Anna Harr is an American actress. She is known for her work on the films Stasis, Bethany and Krampus Origins.

Life and career
Anna was born in Phoenix, Arizona. She has four sisters and two brothers. She is a gymnast and a dancer. In 2017, she was cast in a role as Bethany/Young Claire in the film Bethany and played both lead roles in the film Stasis, later released by Netflix. Her upcoming film Hot Seat, starring Mel Gibson and Kevin Dillon will release in 2022.

Filmography

References

External links
 
 

Living people
American television actresses
American film actresses
21st-century American actresses
20th-century American actresses
2000 births